Dromos may refer to:

 Cursus publicus, the public road system of the Roman and Byzantine empires
 Dromos, in architecture, an entrance passage or avenue leading to a building
 Dromoi, modes (types of scales) used in Greek music